Michael Kramer may refer to:

 Michael Krämer (born 1985), German football player
 Michael Eric Kramer (born 1962), American actor
 Michael Kramer (narrator), American audiobook narrator
 Mike Kramer (born 1955), American football coach
 Michael Kramer (astronomer) (born 1967), German radio astronomer and astrophysicist
 Michael Kramer (Minnesota politician) (1886-1955), American farer, railway employee , and politician